Richard J. Gilbert is an American Economist, professor at UC Berkeley from 1976 to 2000, and founder of LECG Corp. (Law and Economics Consulting Group).  Richard ('Rich') Gilbert served as Deputy Assistant General in the Antitrust Division of the U.S. Department of Justice in the White House from 1993 to 1995, and author of Innovation Matters: Competition Policy for the Knowledge Economy, published by M.I.T. Press. While serving for the United States Justice Department, Richard Gilbert led the development of Joint Department of Justice and Federal Trade Commission Antitrust Guidelines for the Licensing of Intellectual Property. Currently Distinguished Professor Emeritus of Economics at the University of California at Berkeley, Richard Gilbert was president of the Industrial Organization Society at University of California, Berkeley during his tenure and from 2002 to 2005 the Chair of the Economics department there. Professor Gilbert has taken special interest in Innovation, Organizational behavior, and Energy economics. Richard J. Gilbert now works as Emeritus from the University, as a consultant for Compass Lexicon and was on the Board of the East Bay College Fund Oakland Promise Association.

Career 
Richard Gilbert contributed to the improvement of the Joint Department of Justice and Federal Trade Commission Antitrust, Guidelines for the Licensing of Intellectual Property during the two years, 1993-1995 when he was a Deputy Assistant Attorney General in the Antitrust Division of the U.S. Department. Until becoming a Deputy Assistant Attorney General Professor Gilbert was the director of the University of California Energy Institute. At the same time, he was an associate editor in several journals such as '[The Journal of Economic Theory], [The Journal of Industrial Economics] and [The Review of Industrial Organization]'.

Education 
B.S. Electrical Engineering at Cornell University 1966 
M.S. Electrical Engineering at Cornell University 1967
Ph.D from Stanford University 1976 

Research areas::
Intellectual Property
Research and Development
Energy Markets
Antitrust Economics

Sabbatical working for the Cambridge University 
Worked with expert economists in Bergen, Norway.

Recently published papers 
 Stepwise Innovation
Stepwise Innovation
 Licensing and Innovation with Imperfect Contract Enforcement
Licensing and Innovation
 Collective Rights Organizations: A Guide to Benefits, Costs and Antitrust Safeguards
Collective Rights Organizations: A Guide to Benefits, Costs and Antitrust Safeguards

References 

Living people
Cornell University College of Engineering alumni
Stanford University alumni
American economists
Year of birth missing (living people)
University of California, Berkeley College of Letters and Science faculty
United States Department of Justice officials